Sylvain Rochon is a Canadian politician, who was elected to the National Assembly of Quebec in a by-election on March 9, 2015. He represented the electoral district of Richelieu as a member of the Parti Québécois until 2018.

Prior to his election to the legislature, Rochon worked as a journalist for local radio station CJSO-FM, and as a political assistant to both Élaine Zakaïb, his predecessor as MNA for Richelieu, and Zakaïb's predecessor Sylvain Simard.

Electoral record

References

Living people
Parti Québécois MNAs
Canadian radio journalists
French Quebecers
21st-century Canadian politicians
Year of birth missing (living people)